Shahrak-e Emam Khomeyni (also Romanized as Shahrak-e Emām Khomeynī; also known as Shahrak-e Emām) is a village in Dasht-e Laleh Rural District, Asir District, Mohr County, Fars Province, Iran. At the 2006 census, its population was 1,376, in 284 families.

References 

Populated places in Mohr County